The Rum River State Forest is a state forest located in Kanabec, Mille Lacs and Morrison counties in central Minnesota. The forest is nearby the city of Onamia and is along the Rum River, just downstream (south) of Mille Lacs Lake.  The forest is managed by the Minnesota Department of Natural Resources. The forest is home to many Northern hardwoods such as maple, oak, ash, elm and basswood that occupy most of the upland areas while tamarack and black spruce are found in lowland and marshy areas.

History
The original landscape consisted of predominantly virgin white pine, red oak, and white oak. Much of the original forest was cut down for timber and floated down the Rum River and Ann River to sawmills downstream. Following the deforestation of the area, farms were established along the Rum River area. However, many of these farms failed in the 1930s and were abandoned. In 1935, the Minnesota Legislature established both the Rum River and Mille Lacs State Forest. In 1963, both of these forests were combined into the Rum River State Forest.

Recreation
Popular outdoor recreational activities in the forest include dispersed camping. Trails are designated for such varied uses such as mountain biking and hiking. In the wintertime, trails are designated for cross-country skiing and snowmobiling. Mille Lacs Lake is located just north of the forest. Along the northern boundary of the forest is Mille Lacs Kathio State Park which contains 19 identified archaeological sites, making it one of the most significant archaeological collections in Minnesota.

See also
List of Minnesota state forests
Rum River
Mille Lacs Lake
Mille Lacs Kathio State Park

References

External links
Rum River State Forest - Minnesota Department of Natural Resources (DNR)

Minnesota state forests
Protected areas of Kanabec County, Minnesota
Protected areas of Mille Lacs County, Minnesota
Protected areas of Morrison County, Minnesota
Protected areas established in 1935